William Daniel Corbett (born March 30, 1960) is an American writer and performer for television, film and theatre. He was a writer and performer on the cult television show Mystery Science Theater 3000 (MST3K), for which he voiced the robot Crow T. Robot during the show's later seasons on the Sci Fi Channel. During that time, he also played the character Observer, along with other minor roles.

Career
In addition to his work on Mystery Science Theater 3000, in 1991 he starred in the computer game Sherlock Holmes: Consulting Detective, and in 2001, Corbett co-wrote the Sci Fi Channel miniseries The Adventures of Edward the Less with several other former MST3K writers. Corbett also co-wrote the 2008 film Meet Dave starring Eddie Murphy.

From 2002 to 2006, Corbett was a member of The Film Crew, a movie-riffing comedic team comprising former MST3K costars Michael J. Nelson and Kevin Murphy. Since 2006, Corbett has also recorded audio commentary tracks with Nelson and Murphy for Nelson's RiffTrax service and contributes regular humor posts to the RiffTrax blog. In 2014, Corbett and Rifftrax colleague Len Peralta created the comic book Super Powered Revenge Christmas.

Bill Corbett hosted the podcast Bill Corbett's Funhouse from October 2018, until its ending in January 2020.

Bill Corbett appeared on the September 29, 2020 of The George Lucas Talk Show with fellow guest Dana Schwartz.

Personal life 
Corbett attended Xaverian High School, going on to earn a Bachelor of Arts from Yale College and a Master of Fine Arts from the Yale School of Drama.

Corbett lives in Minneapolis with his wife Virginia and their two children.

He is also a member of the Democratic Socialists of America and helped canvass for Eunisses Hernandez and Hugo Soto-Martinez during the 2022 Los Angeles elections.

See also 
 Timmy Big Hands

References

External links 

 
 RiffTrax profile
 Posts by Bill Corbett on the RiffTrax Blog
 The MST3k Info Club
 Bill Corbett's Funhouse

American puppeteers
American male television actors
American television writers
American male television writers
American comedy writers
People from Brooklyn
Yale School of Drama alumni
1960 births
Living people
Members of the Democratic Socialists of America
Xaverian High School alumni
Screenwriters from New York (state)
Yale College alumni